King Edward Street is a street in the City of London that runs from Newgate Street in the south to Little Britain in the north. It is joined by Greyfriars Passage in the west and Angel Street in the east. Postman's Park is on its east side where Bull and Mouth Street once lay and joined King Edward Street.

History

The street was once known for its butchers and slaughterhouses and had the names Butchers' Hall Lane, Stinking Lane, Chick Lane, and Blowbladder Street. According to John Strype in 1720 the butchers had been replaced by milliners and seamstresses. It received its current name in 1843 in memory of King Edward VI.

Buildings
Notable buildings in the street include:
The remains of Christ Church Greyfriars
King Edward's Buildings
The statue of Rowland Hill
1 St Martin's Le Grand (rear)
British Telecom head office (in Newman Street)

References

External links 

Streets in the City of London